Paper Tiger is a 2020 American drama thriller film written and directed by Paul Kowalski.

The film world premiered at the 2020 Austin Film Festival. It was subsequently sold by The Gersh Agency, and was released on August 24, 2021, by Gravitas Ventures.

Cast
 Lydia Look as Lily
 Alan Trong as Edward
 Elaine Kao as Mei
 Seth Numrich as JT
 John Harlan Kim as Kevin
 Lynn Chen as Ms. Li
 Carrie Wampler as Jessica

Release
After premiering at Austin Film Festival on October 23, 2020, the film won the festival's Audience Award and a mention from the Jury. Continuing its festival run, Paper Tiger was awarded Best in Show and Best Narrative Feature awards at the 2021 Fargo Film Festival. On August 9, Variety announced The Gersh Agency had negotiated a sale, with Gravitas Ventures picking up North American distribution rights. The film was released on August 24, 2021.

External links

References

2020 films
2020 directorial debut films
2020 thriller drama films
American thriller drama films
American independent films
2020 independent films
2020s English-language films
2020s American films